"It's Hard out Here for a Pimp" is a song written by American hip hop group Three 6 Mafia, alongside Cedric Coleman, as the theme song to the American drama film Hustle & Flow (2005).  It won the Academy Award for Best Original Song and in 2006 was ranked number 80 on VH1's "100 Greatest Songs of Hip Hop".

Background
The song was performed in Hustle & Flow by Terrence Howard and Taraji P. Henson as their respective characters DJay and Shug. Three 6 Mafia included their own version of the song with vocalist Paula Campbell on a 2006 special edition reissue of their platinum album Most Known Unknown.

In 2015, Howard and Henson compete against each other in the Season 1 finale of the Spike series Lip Sync Battle and, by popular demand, performed the song as the first duet by competitors in the show's history.

78th Academy Awards
At the 78th Academy Awards in 2006, Three 6 Mafia and Henson performed the song shortly before it won the Academy Award for Best Original Song. Howard did not wish to perform at the ceremony, and since two of the song's writers are themselves artists in the form of the trio Three 6 Mafia, they were given the opportunity to perform it. Three 6 Mafia became the first hip hop group to win an Academy Award for Best Original Song, and the first hip hop artists to perform at the ceremony. It was the second hip hop song to win an Oscar, after Eminem's "Lose Yourself" from the film 8 Mile (2002).

This song became the third in five years to win the Oscar without a Golden Globe Award nomination. The others were "If I Didn't Have You" from Monsters, Inc. (2001) and "Al Otro Lado del Río" from The Motorcycle Diaries (2004).

References

Songs about procurers
2005 songs
Three 6 Mafia songs
Best Original Song Academy Award-winning songs
Songs written by Juicy J
Gangsta rap songs
Songs written by DJ Paul